Leptodea ochracea is a species of freshwater mussel, an aquatic bivalve mollusc in the family Unionidae, the river mussels.

This species is native to the east coast of the United States and Canada (New Brunswick and Nova Scotia).

References

ochracea
Molluscs of North America
Bivalves described in 1817
Taxonomy articles created by Polbot